Regional Council elections were held in Réunion in 1986 as part of the wider French regional elections. The Rally for the Republic–Union for French Democracy alliance remained the largest in the Regional Council, winning 18 of the 45 seats.

Results

References

Reunion
Reunion
Elections in Réunion
1986 in Réunion
Election and referendum articles with incomplete results